Beloglinsky District is an administrative district (raion), one of the thirty-eight in Krasnodar Krai, Russia. As a municipal division, it is incorporated as Beloglinsky Municipal District. It is located in the east of the krai. Its administrative center is the rural locality of (a selo) of Belaya Glina. Population:  The population of Belaya Glina accounts for 55.3% of the district's total population.

References

Notes

Sources

Districts of Krasnodar Krai